Prince Frederick William of Great Britain (13 May 1750 – 29 December 1765) was a grandchild of King George II and the youngest brother of King George III. He was the youngest son of Frederick, Prince of Wales and Princess Augusta of Saxe-Gotha.

He died at the young age of 15. He was buried at Westminister Abbey, London.

Life

Frederick was born on 13 May 1750, at Leicester House, Westminster, London. His father was Frederick, Prince of Wales, eldest son of George II and Caroline of Ansbach. His mother was The Princess of Wales (née Augusta of Saxe-Gotha).

He was christened on 17 June of the same year, at the same house, by the Bishop of Oxford, Thomas Secker. His godparents were his brother Prince George, his maternal uncle Prince Wilhelm of Saxe-Gotha-Altenburg and his sister Princess Augusta.

The young prince died on 29 December 1765, at Leicester House.

Titles, styles, honours and arms

Titles and styles
13 May 1750 – 29 December 1765: His Royal Highness Prince Frederick

Arms
Frederick was posthumously granted the arms of the kingdom differenced by a label argent of five points, the centre bearing a fleur-de-lys azure, the other points each bearing a rose gules.

Ancestors

References

Princes of Great Britain
House of Hanover
People from Westminster
1750 births
1765 deaths
Burials at Westminster Abbey
Children of Frederick, Prince of Wales

Royalty and nobility who died as children